West Auckland is a former New Zealand parliamentary electorate on the western outskirts of Auckland, created for the  from part of the former  electorate.

Population centres
The 1981 census had shown that the North Island had experienced further population growth, and three additional general seats were created through the 1983 electoral redistribution, bringing the total number of electorates to 95. The South Island had, for the first time, experienced a population loss, but its number of general electorates was fixed at 25 since the 1967 electoral redistribution. More of the South Island population was moving to Christchurch, and two electorates were abolished, while two electorates were recreated. In the North Island, six electorates were newly created (including West Auckland), three electorates were recreated, and six electorates were abolished.

In 1984 the electorate included Kumeu, Hobsonville, Henderson, Rānui and Waitakere; much of the area had previously been in the southern part of the  electorate. In 1987 it was moved to the south, losing Hobsonville and much of Kumeu while gaining Titirangi and Piha.

History

Members of Parliament
Key

Election results

1990 election

1987 election

1984 election

Notes

References

Historical electorates of New Zealand
Politics of the Auckland Region
1984 establishments in New Zealand
1993 disestablishments in New Zealand
West Auckland, New Zealand